Raymond J. Lane (born December 26, 1946) is an American business executive and strategist specializing in technology and finance. Lane is best known for assisting corporations with technology strategy, organizational development, team building, and sales and growth management.

Lane led a "go to market" overhaul of Oracle Corporation, which led to an increase in sales and stock price in the 1990s. He is cited as being the catalyst for "Oracle's success, ‘past, present and future.’"

Lane is a partner emeritus at Kleiner Perkins Caufield & Byers, a venture capital firm in Silicon Valley. 
He managed investments and held board membership in startup companies, including the development of enterprise technology and alternative energy.

Early life and education

Raymond Jay Lane was born on December 26, 1946, in McKeesport, Pennsylvania, near Pittsburgh. Lane grew up in rural western Pennsylvania where his father was employed as a design engineer for steel production plants. Lane was heavily influenced by his father, who had emerged from the Depression-era steel business as the first member of his family to go to college, graduating from Carnegie Mellon as a mechanical engineer.

Lane attended public schools, graduating from Moon High School in 1964. Wishing to follow in his father's footsteps, Lane first pursued a collegiate career in aeronautical engineering at West Virginia University (WVU). He later changed his major and graduated with a bachelor's degree in mathematics in 1968.

Career

IBM

Shortly after graduating, Lane was recruited to IBM's data processing division for a sales position. In 1969,  Lane was drafted to the U.S. Army, assigned to the 1st Infantry Division at Fort Riley, Kansas. Because of his computer knowledge, he was made a systems analyst responsible for logistical computer systems. He completed two years of military service and resumed his career in 1971 at IBM, achieving top sales awards for three years and being promoted to a product manager responsible for large mainframe and storage systems in one of IBM's largest regions.

EDS

After eight years with IBM, Lane was recruited by Electronic Data Systems (EDS), led at the time by Ross Perot. He was handed responsibility for a new division that provided services to large manufacturers, distributors, and retail and transportation companies. Lane ran the nascent division for nearly four years.

Booz Allen Hamilton

In 1981 Lane accepted a principal position with Booz Allen Hamilton in Chicago. At Booz Allen, he helped develop information technology strategies. Lane became a partner in three years and a senior partner by 1986. He led the development in the late 1980s of became known as Information Systems Group, one of two functional practices, and four industry practices that were the firm's primary organization. He sat on the firm's executive committee and board of directors from 1987 to 1992.

Oracle

In 1992, Lane was recruited by Oracle Corporation to turn around the firm's sales, service, consulting and marketing, and named president of Oracle USA in June. Oracle, suffering from rapid growth in the late '80s without checks and balances on its customer practices, was also falling behind technologically. The rapid turnaround in the mid-90s, fueled by a new database technology, Oracle 7, and by Lane's organization of sales and services at the company, led to the rise of Oracle's business applications division. Apple founder Steve Jobs recalled that "Larry told me that 15 minutes into the meeting, he knew Ray was the only guy he had met who was near smart enough to run Oracle." In 1996, Lane was named the president and chief operating officer of Oracle. Under his leadership, along with Larry Ellison and Jeff Henley, Oracle expanded from 7,500 to 40,000 employees, defeating its main database rivals Sybase and Informix, to become the leader in the database industry while building major businesses in ERP applications and consulting. In mid-2000, Lane suddenly left the company, leading to speculation Oracle's business needs had outgrown him.

Kleiner Perkins Caufield & Byers

In 2000, Lane accepted a position with Kleiner Perkins Caufield & Byers.  Lane's work at KPCB centered on enterprise technology and alternative energy. As of 2013 Lane became partner emeritus of Kleiner Perkins.
He serves as chairman of the board of Elance, an online staffing platform, and of Aquion Energy.

HP

Lane served as non-executive chairman on Hewlett-Packard's board of directors from 2010 to 2011, and as executive chairman from 2011 to 2013. Lane restructured the board to add seven new directors, replaced the short-tenured CEO Leo Apotheker, and led the placement of Meg Whitman as CEO. Lane was chairman when HP decided to acquire Autonomy Corporation, a controversial acquisition that led him to step down as chairman, but remain on the board of directors.

GreatPoint Ventures
Lane currently serves as a Managing Partner at GreatPoint Ventures, a venture capital firm headquartered in San Francisco, CA.

Tax dispute

In 2013, it was reported that Lane was involved in a personal tax dispute. The case stemmed from a tax year 2000 audit that reviewed an investment in a tax strategy used by Lane's advisors called POPS (Partnership Option Portfolio Securities) to offset a minority of Lane's income. Lane agreed to settle in excess of $100 million.

On January 3, 2014, Lane filed a lawsuit against Deutsche Bank, and BDO Seidman, LLP alleging that he had suffered damage as a result of their having designed an allegedly "fraudulent" tax shelter.

Personal life and philanthropy

Lane has three children, Kristi, Kelley, and Kari, with his first wife, Donna. He is married to Stephanie (Herle) Lane, with whom he has two children, Raymond Jay Lane III ("RJay") and Catherine Victoria ("Tori").

Lane's philanthropic interests include work in higher education, the Special Olympics, and Cancer Research.

Lane serves as the chairman of the board of trustees of Carnegie Mellon University. He led the institution's capital campaign and efforts to establish a Silicon Valley campus in 2002. In 2010, the Lanes funded the Carnegie Mellon's Computational Biology program (The Lane Center for Computational Biology), which is the Computational Biology Department, one of six degree-granting departments in the School of Computer Science. In 2015, the Lane Center for Computational Cancer Research was established within the department. Lane also funded a professorship chair in his father's name held by Robert F. Murphy (computational biologist). Additionally, he is a benefactor to his alma mater, West Virginia University, where he sits on its board of governors. He chaired a WVU capital campaign in the early 2000s. In September 2007, the Lanes made a $5 million contribution to the university's Computer Science and Electrical Engineering programs, for which the university honored them by naming the department The Lane Department of Computer Science and Electrical Engineering.

Lane has served as vice chairman of Special Olympics International for several years. In October 2011, Ray and Stephanie funded the organization's international expansion project, Unify, which unites school age youth with intellectual disabilities with their healthy counterparts.

Ray and Stephanie Lane are contributors to the American Cancer Society, and sponsor functions to raise additional funds. The Lanes initiated and funded the Stephanie H. Lane Cancer Research Network, a central service in the state of California to help cancer patients get information and treatment.

As of  2019, Lane is an advisor for Inxeption, a California-based technology platform.

Recognition

 TechAmerica, "David Packard Lifetime Medal of Achievement," 2011.
 Inducted into West Virginia University's Business Hall of Fame (2003)  Academy of Distinguished Alumni (2004) and the Order of the Vandalia (2005).
 Smithsonian Leadership Award for Collaborative Innovation, 2001. 
 Kappa Sigma Man of the Year, 2000.
 Honorary Ph.D.'s, West Virginia University, Golden Gate University. 
 West Virginia University, Lane Department of Computer Science and Electrical Engineering.
 Carnegie Mellon, Lane Center for Computational Cancer Research.

References

1946 births
Living people
American computer businesspeople
Carnegie Mellon University trustees
Booz Allen Hamilton people
West Virginia University alumni
Kleiner Perkins people